Joseph Csatari (born 1929, South River, New Jersey, as son of Hungarian immigrants) is a realist artist who worked with Norman Rockwell. As a boy, Csatari had painstakingly recreated Saturday Evening Post covers that Rockwell had painted. In 1977, shortly before Rockwell died, Csatari was commissioned as the Boy Scouts of America (BSA)'s official artist.

Early life and career
Csatari studied art at the Academy of Arts, Newark, New Jersey and also at the Pratt Institute in Brooklyn. In 1953, he became an artist in the layout division in BSA Supply Division's advertising department. In 1958, he became the art director; designing advertising and sales promotional pieces, cover illustrations, and posters. Like his mentor Rockwell, he also served as art director of Boys' Life magazine at the beginning of his career, being named to that position in 1973. This was the time he worked closely with Rockwell. Csatari's job was to come up with possible themes for the paintings and make rough sketches for Rockwell. Once Rockwell decided on a concept, Csatari would gather models and shuttle them up for a photo shoot in the artist's studio in Stockbridge, Massachusetts. Csatari often assisted Rockwell on his work at this time as by then Rockwell was aging. In 1976 when Rockwell retired from the calendar commission, the BSA asked Csatari to continue in the Rockwell tradition. Csatari says that while he paints in Rockwell's style, he is no Rockwell, whom he considers in another league.

Since the 1977 BSA calendar, Csatari has made 24 paintings for the Boy Scouts of America, including a painting commemorating the endowment program's 1910 Society. In 1997 an exhibit of these paintings toured the United States at fund-raising events in local councils throughout the country. Though it's not well known, Csatari also painted more than 10 official portraits of BSA presidents and Chief Scout Executives during his career. But it is his paintings of "Boy Scouts being Boy Scouts, having fun in the outdoors, and doing community service projects" that he finds most rewarding.

Csatari became a freelance artist in 1977 and has painted for many magazines and companies, as well as having painted designs for two U.S. postage stamps and several book covers. He lives in South River, New Jersey, where he maintains an art studio at his home, and has a wife and three children. He has received several awards of excellence in Editorial Art Directing from the Society of Illustrators, New York.

In early June 2005, Csatari was awarded the BSA's highest honor, the Silver Buffalo Award.  In 2008, a twelve-city U.S. tour of Norman Rockwell's and Csatari's artworks was scheduled.

Critique of his work
Being an eager and willing disciple of Rockwell, Csatari is often viewed in the same manner, an illustrator, not an artist, who paints in overly sentimental tones when depicting people and Americana. Csatari does not mind these comparisons and critiques, nor did Rockwell. Csatari's paintings of nature are quite accurate and detailed.

Major works
1975
1976 Boy Scout Handbook Cover
1976
The New Spirit
1977
Scouting Through The Years
1978
Eagle Service Project
1979
The Reunion
1980
After Hours
1981
The Patrol Leader
1982
Family Camping
1983
The Strength Of Scouting Through Volunteers
1985
It's A Boys' Life
Spirit Lives On
1986
Values That Last A Lifetime
1987
A Winter Camping Scene
1988
You Can Do It
1989
The Scoutmaster
1990
Scouting For All Seasons
1991
Florida Sea Base
1992
A Good Turn
1994
A Scout is Reverent
Character Counts
1995
Pass It On
1996
Scouting Values
1997
Urban Good Turn
2000
Happy 90th Birthday
Out of the Past, Into The Future
2001
Jamboree
2003
Prepared To Do A Good Turn
2004
Dreams Become A Reality
2005
75th Anniversary of Cub Scouting
2010
Centennial of Scouting

Footnotes

 
 
 
 "Artist has another brush with fame" by John Dunphy, Sentinel, June 9, 2005, retrieved January 30, 2006

References

 (article by Csatari on Rockwell)

External links

Marchese, John (January–February 2003). I Work From Real Life. Scouting Magazine.

1929 births
20th-century American painters
American male painters
21st-century American painters
American illustrators
Living people
People from South River, New Jersey
Scouting in popular culture
People from Stockbridge, Massachusetts
20th-century American male artists